This is a list of the members of the Australian House of Representatives in the Eighth Australian Parliament, which was elected at the 1919 election on 13 December 1919.

Notes

Members of Australian parliaments by term
20th-century Australian politicians